PS Great Western was a passenger vessel built for Ford and Jackson in 1867 and then used by the Great Western Railway from 1872 to 1890.

History

She was built by William Simons of Renfrew and launched on 9 March 1864. She was completed in 1867 and owned by Ford and Jackson and deployed on their Milford to Cork route.

In 1872 she was purchased by the Great Western Railway. In 1887 she was chartered to the Weymouth and Channel Islands Steam Packet Company. On 15 August 1888, she ran aground at Weymouth. In 1893 she was rebuilt with one funnel.

She was obtained by David MacBrayne in 1891 and renamed PS Lovedale. On 13 November 1893 she was involved in a collision with the SS Brook off Broadford, Isle of Skye, which resulted in a court case for damages.

She ended her career freighting sheep from Islay to Glasgow, and her master, Lachlan McTavish was convicted at Glasgow Central Police Court with causing unnecessary suffering to  the sheep. She was licensed for 750 sheep but was carrying 1170 aboard. Three sheep were suffocated.

In 1904 she was towed into Port Ellen with a broken crankshaft and was scrapped.

References

1864 ships
Passenger ships of the United Kingdom
Paddle steamers of the United Kingdom
Steamships of the United Kingdom
Ships built on the River Clyde
Ships of the Great Western Railway
PS Great Western
Maritime incidents in August 1888
Maritime incidents in 1893